Craig "CJ" Jackson is an American journalist. He is the host of the VH1 reality television series I Love Money.

Jackson was previously a news anchor and correspondent for Channel One News for five years, as well as host of Fox's 30 Seconds To Fame and FX's The X Show. He also hosted a special for the Food Network and a Game Show Network pilot entitled Two Minute Mysteries. Craig currently hosts Discovery Channel's National Body Challenge and co-hosts Midnight Money Madness on TBS while maintaining a name on the stand-up comedy circuit.

References

Living people
American male journalists
Year of birth missing (living people)
VH1 people
African-American game show hosts
African-American television hosts